The yellow-tailed African tetra (Alestopetersius caudalis) is a freshwater fish that lives in the Congo River basin.  It is found in both the Democratic Republic of the Congo and the Republic of the Congo (via an unsubstantiated report). It is an omnivore in the wild which feeds on crustaceans, fallen fruits and small insects, but seems to have little difficulty in adjusting to normal aquarium foods . though they can be fed in aquarium with daphnia, bloostorm and artemia along good quality dried flakes and granules at least some of which should include additional plant or algal content. The species can tolerate water up to 20 degrees DH, though it does better in softer water. A temperature of 22–26 °C (72–79 °F) and a pH of between 5.0 and 7.5 and a hardness of between 36 and 268ppm is suitable.
adult male are more colorful and tend to grow faster than females. males also develops extended white-tipped dorsal, ventral, caudal and anal fins which females lack.
it is an egg scattered exhibiting no parental care, and one method of breeding is apparently to keep a group of adults in their own aquarium furnished with a kind of artificial trap, checking it regularly as much as possible especially for eggs. these are removed and normally hatched in smaller containers with the fry being offered microscopic foods until large enough to accept daphnia, bloostorm and the rest.

Conservation status
The IUCN Red List includes the yellow-tailed African tetra as a species of least concern.  Changes in its wild population trend have not been identified.

References

Sources
IUCN Red list: http://www.iucnredlist.org/apps/redlist/search
Fishbase: http://fishbase.org.cn/Summary/SpeciesSummary.php?ID=11107&AT=African+tetra
https://www.seriouslyfish.com

External links
https://www.aqua-fish.net/fish/yellowtail-tetra
Yellow Tail Tetra Fact Sheet

Freshwater fish of Africa
Tetras
Taxa named by George Albert Boulenger
Fish described in 1899